Kojły  (Koily) is a village in the administrative district of Gmina Czyże, within Hajnówka County, Podlaskie Voivodeship, in north-eastern Poland.

According to the 1921 census, the village was inhabited by 386 people, among whom 380 Orthodox, and 6 Mosaic. At the same time, all inhabitants declared Belarusian nationality. There were 84 residential buildings in the village.

References

Villages in Hajnówka County